Penton Mewsey is a village and civil parish in Hampshire, England.

The village is home to approximately 400 people and has about 110 houses. The name Penton is derived from Penitone, which is a farm held at penny rent. The village is adjacent to the hamlet and parish of Penton Grafton. Both villages are collectively known as The Pentons.

Until the 1920s the Pentons were mainly agricultural communities supporting sheep and corn, typical of northern Hampshire at the time. The Pentons are still surrounded by farmland which is currently completely arable. Today, three stables provide the main village-based commercial activities. The Holy Trinity church dates from the 14th century, although it was refurbished extensively in the 19th century.

It is also the current home of Sir George Young.

References

External links

Penton Mewsey Parish Council

Villages in Hampshire